North English is a city located mainly in Iowa county with a small portion in Keokuk county in the U.S. state of Iowa. The population was 1,065 at the time of the 2020 census. It is named for the English River.

History
North English was laid out in 1855; it was originally called Nevada.

Geography
North English is located at  (41.515202, -92.078331).

Demographics

2010 census
As of the census of 2010, there were 1,041 people, 444 households, and 276 families living in the city. The racial makeup of the city was 99.2% White, 0.3% African American, and 0.5% from two or more races. Hispanic or Latino of any race were 0.7% of the population.

There were 444 households, of which 29.7% had children under the age of 18 living with them, 45.5% were married couples living together, 13.1% had a female householder with no husband present, 3.6% had a male householder with no wife present, and 37.8% were non-families. 35.4% of all households were made up of individuals, and 18.1% had someone living alone who was 65 years of age or older. The average household size was 2.23 and the average family size was 2.86.

The median age in the city was 41.7 years. 24.9% of residents were under the age of 18; 5.6% were between the ages of 18 and 24; 23% were from 25 to 44; 23.3% were from 45 to 64; and 23.2% were 65 years of age or older. The gender makeup of the city was 45.7% male and 54.3% female.

2000 census
As of the census of 2000, there were 991 people, 408 households, and 255 families living in the city. The racial makeup of the city was 98.99% White, 0.10% African American, 0.30% Native American, 0.10% Asian, and 0.50% from two or more races. Hispanic or Latino of any race were 1.01% of the population.

There were 408 households, out of which 28.2% had children under the age of 18 living with them, 50.5% were married couples living together, 9.8% had a female householder with no husband present, and 37.3% were non-families. 33.6% of all households were made up of individuals, and 17.6% had someone living alone who was 65 years of age or older. The average household size was 2.29 and the average family size was 2.94.

Age spread:  22.5% under the age of 18, 7.0% from 18 to 24, 24.4% from 25 to 44, 18.2% from 45 to 64, and 28.0% who were 65 years of age or older. The median age was 42 years. For every 100 females, there were 84.5 males. For every 100 females age 18 and over, there were 77.4 males.

The median income for a household in the city was $32,639, and the median income for a family was $43,162. Males had a median income of $31,480 versus $23,563 for females. The per capita income for the city was $16,158. About 5.9% of families and 8.2% of the population were below the poverty line, including 8.8% of those under age 18 and 7.6% of those age 65 or over.

Schools
North English is located within the English Valleys Community School District. Schools include:
 English Valleys Elementary School
 English Valleys Jr/Sr High School

Notable person

Mace Brown, born in North English, was a relief pitcher in Major League Baseball

References

Cities in Iowa
Cities in Iowa County, Iowa
Cities in Keokuk County, Iowa
1855 establishments in Iowa
Populated places established in 1855